Xylographus is a genus of tree-fungus beetles in the family Ciidae.

Species
The genus contains the following species:

 Xylographus anthracinus Mellié, 1849
 Xylographus bicolor Pic, 1916
 Xylographus bostrichoides (Dufour, 1843)
 Xylographus brasiliensis Pic, 1916
 Xylographus bynoei Blair, 1940
 Xylographus ceylonicus Ancey, 1876
 Xylographys contractus Mellié, 1849
 Xylographus corpulentus Mellié, 1849
 Xylographus gibbus Mellié, 1849
 Xylographus globipennis Reitter, 1911
 Xylographus hypocritus Mellié, 1849
 Xylographus javanus Pic, 1937
 Xylographus lemoulti Pic, 1916
 Xylographus longicollis Pic, 1922
 Xylographus lucasi Lopes-Andrade & Zacaro, 2003
 Xylographus madagascariensis Mellié, 1849
 Xylographus nitidissimus Pic, 1916
 Xylographus perforatus Gerstaecker, 1871
 Xylographus porcus Gorham, 1886
 Xylographus punctatus Mellié, 1849
 Xylographus richardi Mellié, 1849
 Xylographus ritsemai Pic, 1921
 Xylographus rufescens Pic, 1921
 Xylographus rufipennis Pic, 1934
 Xylographus rufipes Pic, 1930
 Xylographus scheerpeltzi Nobuchi & Wada, 1956
 Xylographus seychellensis Scott, 1926
 Xylographus subopacus Pic, 1929
 Xylographus subsinuatus Pic, 1916
 Xylographus suillus Gorham, 1886
 Xylographus tarsalis Fahraeus, 1871
 Xylographus testaceitarsis Pic, 1916
 Xylographus tomicoides Reitter, 1901

References

Ciidae genera